Alberto Rizzo (born 25 April 1997) is an Italian footballer who plays as a defender for  club Foggia.

Club career
He made his Serie C debut for Trapani on 2 September 2017 in a game against Lecce.

On 19 September 2020, he signed with Juve Stabia.

On 20 January 2022, he signed a contract with Foggia until 30 June 2024.

References

External links
 
 

1997 births
Living people
People from Erice
Footballers from Sicily
Italian footballers
Association football defenders
Serie B players
Serie C players
Serie D players
Trapani Calcio players
A.C. Cuneo 1905 players
A.S. Cittadella players
S.S. Juve Stabia players
Calcio Foggia 1920 players
Sportspeople from the Province of Trapani